AnaCap Financial Partners is a private equity firm advising funds that invest in the European financial services sector.

History
AnaCap Financial Partners was founded in 2005. The firm launched its debut fund in 2006, when it raised €300 million and now advises more than €3.5 billion across private equity and credit opportunity strategies including coinvest. AnaCap’s funds have attracted a global investor base including institutions such as Goldman Sachs and Allianz.

Private Equity
The firm’s strategy is to invest in European financial services businesses with management teams providing the necessary support to generate exceptional returns. They provide operational support to portfolio companies throughout the life of the investment in order to achieve the targeted objectives. The general business of AnaCap is to source investment opportunities and work with management teams of businesses with growth potential. The methodology that AnaCap follows involves using proprietary data analysis techniques in countries throughout Europe to find opportunities in different markets.

Credit Opportunities
AnaCap’s strategy also encompasses European credit opportunities, which the firm has been doing since 2010. Categories that AnaCap focuses on include consumer and small and mid-sized enterprise debt including performing, semi-performing and non-performing assets consisting of loans, leases, securities, residential and commercial mortgages, unsecured consumer loans, and other receivables.

The strategies that AnaCap uses when investing in credit opportunities involve using their proprietary analysis methods, as well as the in-house Minerva platform. The Minerva platform is unique to AnaCap, and provides reporting services to the debt servicers for the credit opportunities assets.

Leadership
AnaCap is led by former heads of the UK financing arm of General Motors, co-managing partners Joe Giannamore and Peter Cartwright, and has several other key individuals in leadership positions, including Justin Sulger, Head of Credit, Chris Patrick, who serves as Head of Risk and Liability Management, Amber Hilkene, Head of Investor Relations and Communications, and Mike Edwards, Chief Operating Partner.

News
AnaCap was involved with the purchase, turnaround, and sale of Cabot Credit Management (CCM). This entity was formed through merging companies Apex Credit Management and Cabot Financial, with CCM ultimately being sold to the firm J.C. Flowers & Co. in 2013. Also taking place in August 2013 was the management buyout of Simply Business, an online broker which AnaCap was responsible for backing.

AnaCap agreed to purchase Brightside Group PLC in May 2014, a British insurance broker for which the firm will pay £127 million. AnaCap has created a company called Belvedere Bidco Ltd. in order to facilitate the purchase.

References

Companies based in the London Borough of Camden
Private equity firms of the United Kingdom